Keiko Tamai (born January 6, 1982) is a Japanese mixed martial arts fighter. She is known for her flamboyant ring attire and personality.

Mixed martial arts record

|-
| Loss
| align=center| 14-14
| Shayna Baszler
| Submission (neck crank)
| ShoXC: Elite Challenger Series
| 
| align=center| 1
| align=center| 2:05
| 
| 
|-
| Loss
| align=center| 14-13
| Marloes Coenen
| Submission (rear naked choke)
| K: GRACE 1
| 
| align=center| 1
| align=center| 2:01
| 
| 
|-
| Loss
| align=center| 14-12
| Michiko Takeda
| Decision (unanimous)
| Smackgirl-Will The Queen Paint The Shinjuku Skies Red?
| 
| align=center| 2
| align=center| 5:00
| 
| 
|-
| Win
| align=center| 14-11
| Jan Finney
| Submission (armbar)
| BodogFIGHT Costa Rica01
| 
| align=center| 2
| align=center| 3:01
| 
| 
|-
| Win
| align=center| 13-11
| Mamiko Mamiko
| Submission (armbar)
| G-Shooto: G-Shooto Special03
| 
| align=center| 1
| align=center| 1:10
| 
| 
|-
| Loss
| align=center| 12-11
| Hitomi Akano
| Submission (armbar)
| MARS-bodogFIGHT 01
| 
| align=center| 2
| align=center| 4:48
| 
| 
|-
| Win
| align=center| 12-10
| Kamei Natsuko
| Submission (armbar)
| Smackgirl-Women Hold Their Ground
| 
| align=center| 1
| align=center| 3:13
| 
| 
|-
| Loss
| align=center| 11-10
| Megumi Fujii
| Submission (armbar)
| Smackgirl-Top Girl Battle
| 
| align=center| 1
| align=center| 0:53
| 
| 
|-
| loss
| align=center| 11-9
| Natsuko Kikukawa
| TKO
| Smackgirl-Go West
| 
| align=center| 1
| align=center| 1:13
| 
| 
|-
| Loss
| align=center| 11-8
| Roxanne Modafferi
| Decision (unanimous)
| GCM-Cross Section 1
| 
| align=center| 2
| align=center| 5:00
| 
| 
|-
| win
| align=center| 11-7
| Hikaru Shinohara
| Decision (unanimous)
| Smackgirl-Third Season 5
| 
| align=center| 2
| align=center| 5:00
| 
| 
|-
| Win
| align=center| 10-6
| Lee Hee-Jin
| TKO
| Smackgirl-Advent of Goddess
| 
| align=center| 2
| align=center| 1:48
| 
| 
|-
| Loss
| align=center| 9-6
| Hitomi Akano
| Submission (armbar)
| G-Shooto: G-Shooto 03
| 
| align=center| 1
| align=center| 1:27
| 
| 
|-
|  Win
| align=center| 9-5
| Yumiko Sugimoto
| Decision (unanimous)
| G-Shooto: Plus04
| 
| align=center| 2
| align=center| 5:00
| 
| 
|-
| Win
| align=center| 8-5
| Kumiko Maekawa
| Decision (unanimous)
| Smackgirl: Dynamic!!
| 
| align=center| 2
| align=center| 5:00
| 
| 
|-
| Win
| align=center| 7-5
| Ha Na Kim
| Decision (unanimous)
| Smackgirl: KOREA 2005
| 
| align=center| 2
| align=center| 5:00
| 
| 
|-
| Win
| align=center| 6-5
| Hikaru Shinohara
| Submission (armbar)
| TRIBELATE: vol. 6
| 
| align=center| 2
| align=center| 0:00
| 
| 
|-
| Win
| align=center| 5-5
| Hari Hari
| Decision (unanimous)
| Smackgirl: Niigata Revival Festival 2005
| 
| align=center| 2
| align=center| 5:00
| 
| 
|-
| Win
| align=center| 4-5
| Yuiga Yuiga
| Decision (unanimous)
| Smackgirl: Refresh 2005
| 
| align=center| 2
| align=center| 5:00
| 
| 
|-
| Loss
| align=center| 3-5
| Kaoru Ito
| Technical Submission (armbar)
| Smackgirl: World ReMix
| 
| align=center| 1
| align=center| 3:45
| 
| 
|-
| Loss
| align=center| 3-4
| Akino Akino
| Decision (split)
| Smackgirl: Holy Land Triumphal Return
| 
| align=center| 2
| align=center| 5:00
| 
| 
|-
| Win
| align=center| 3-3
| Natsuko Kikukawa
| Decision (unanimous)
| Smackgirl-Third Season 5
| 
| align=center| 2
| align=center| 5:00
| 
| 
|-
| Loss
| align=center| 2-3
| Yuiga Yuiga
| Submission (choke)
| Smackgirl-Third Season 3
| 
| align=center| 1
| align=center| 4:27
| 
| 
|-
| win
| align=center| 2-2
| Kazue Terui
| Decision
| Smackgirl-Third Season 1
| 
| align=center| 2
| align=center| 3:00
| 
| 
|-
| Loss
| align=center| 1-2
| Yuuki Kondo
| Decision
| Japan Cup 2002 Grand Final
| 
| align=center| 3
| align=center| 5:00
| 
| 
|-
| Loss
| align=center| 1-1
| Mika Harigae
| Submission (armbar)
| Smackgirl-Japan Cup 2002 Episode 2
| 
| align=center| 1
| align=center| 2:52
| 
| 
|-
| Win
| align=center| 1-0
| Etsuko Kato
| Submission (armbar)
| AX-Vol. 5
| 
| align=center| 2
| align=center| 1:11
| 
|

See also
List of female mixed martial artists

External links

1982 births
Living people
Japanese female mixed martial artists
Mixed martial artists utilizing kickboxing
People from Gunma Prefecture
Sportspeople from Gunma Prefecture